The 2017 Sun Belt Conference men's soccer tournament, was the 23rd edition of the tournament. It determined the Sun Belt Conference's automatic berth into the 2017 NCAA Division I Men's Soccer Championship. The tournament was hosted by Coastal Carolina, and all matches were played at CCU Soccer Field.

The 2017 final was a rematch of last year's final. Top-seed and host, Coastal Carolina won their second consecutive Sun Belt title, defeating Georgia State, 2-0 in the final. Coastal Carolina would advance to the 2017 NCAA Division I Men's Soccer Championship, where they reached the Sweet 16. One of the largest upsets in the tournament was Howard, who reached the semifinals after defeating Hartwick, 2-1. It was Howard's second win of the entire season.

Seeding 

All six programs qualified for the Sun Belt Tournament.

Bracket

Results

First round

Semifinals

Final

Statistics

Goals

Assists

Shutouts

See also 
 2017 Sun Belt Conference Women's Soccer Tournament

References

External links 
 Sun Belt Men's Soccer Championship Central

2017
Sun Belt Conference Men's Soccer